Leptophractus is an extinct genus of embolomere which is known from late Carboniferous coal mines near Linton, Ohio.

References 

Embolomeres
Fossil taxa described in 1873